Dallyar Jirdakhan (also Dəllər Cırdaxan, Dallyar Dzhyrdakhan, Dallyar-Dzhirdakhan, Jafar Jabbarly) is a village and municipality in the Shamkir Rayon of Azerbaijan.It has a population of 3,662.

History
Dallyar Jirdakhan was available as a settlement at the beginning of the 18th century. 30 years of the 20th century formed as the village as a result of combination of a few summer and wintering. There are still areas the village called Gimirly, Hajimamedly and Mollaly. Next time the State farm launched in the name of Jafar Jabbarly. That is way this village among the people called Jafar Jabbarly too. There are a variety of considerations about the meaning of Dallyar name. According to one version, this name is associated with Koroghlu's army, which are called "Deliler".

Culture and education
There is a school, kindergarten, hospital and library in the village. The students study in "Dallyar Jirdakhan secondary school in the name of Shahin Amirov". The park which is named Ashiq Yehya bey Dilgem is here and there is a club. It serves the country folk.

Geography
The village of Dallyar Jırdakhan is 4 kilometers away from the right bank of the Kura River, it is in the plains of Ganja-Gazakh economic region. The village is situated 10 km on the north from Shamkir city and 5 km from Dallyar railway station, which is situated on Baku-Tbilisi way.

Population
The current population is 3662. The vast majority of the population is ethnic Azeris, who are Shia Muslims. Also Meskhetian Turks live in the village.

Populated places in Shamkir District